Paul Miron (13 June 1926, Giulești, Suceava County – 17 April 2008, Freiburg, Germany) was a Romanian linguist and philologist, professor at the University of Freiburg, the first professor of Romanian Language and Literature in West Germany.

External links
 "Paul Miron (1926-2008)", serie nouă, XIII, 2008, nr. 2, Cluj-Napoca, p. 113–115
Sorin Lavric,
 "Paul Miron la 80 de ani", in România literară, 23/2006
 "Paul Miron (1926-2008)", in România literară, 16/2008
 Antonina Sârbu, "Doi ani fără Poștalionul din vis, Paul Miron", Revista Limba Română, nr. 3-6, year XXI, 2011

References 

1926 births
2008 deaths
People from Suceava County
Academic staff of the University of Freiburg
Linguists from Romania
Romanian emigrants to Germany
20th-century linguists